Ninjak vs The Valiant Universe is an American superhero action film based on characters appearing in Valiant Comics. The film stars Michael Rowe as the titular Ninjak who must do battle against his former allies, all of whom are superheroes in their own right. Originally produced as a six-episode series in April 2018, it was released as a single film on Valiant Comics' YouTube page on March 26, 2020, as promotion for Bloodshot.

Premise
Colin King / Ninjak is MI6's deadliest intelligence operative and weapons expert. When the ruthless assassin Roku exploits his greatest weakness, Ninjak is forced to betray his closest allies. Now, on the run, he must face off against the most powerful heroes known to man for a high-octane, take-no-prisoners trial by fire more perilous and more unpredictable than any he's faced before.

Cast

Main
 Michael Rowe as Colin King / Ninjak
 John Hennigan as Gilad Anni-Padda / Eternal Warrior
 Chantelle Barry as Angelina Alcott / Roku
 Ciera Foster as Amanda Mckee / Livewire
 Kevin Porter as Aram Anni-Padda / Armstrong
 Alex Meglei as Obadiah "Obie" Archer / Archer
 Damion Poitier as Jack Boniface / Shadowman
 Craig Young as Neville Alcott
 Jason David Frank as Ray Garrison / Bloodshot
 Derek Theler as Aric of Dacia / X-O Manowar

Guest
 Tatiana DeKhtyar as Colonel Capshaw
 Katelyn Statton as Susan Alcott
 Carlie Larson as Jillian Alcott
 Nicola Posener as Agent Vivien 
 Aaron Schoenke as Nicodemo Darque / Master Darque
Andre Gordon as Neville Allcott's Assistant

Production and promotion
The project was first announced indirectly by Michael Rowe through his Twitter account in 2016. It was soon announced that a Ninjak series was in the works with Rowe announced to portray the character. Soon after, it was announced that many of the mainstays of the Valiant Universe would be featured including Armstrong of Archer & Armstrong, Timewalker, Faith, Divinity and Savage. Jason David Frank and John Morrison had also been cast as Bloodshot and Eternal Warrior, respectively. Derek Theler soon joined as X-O Manowar as well as Kevin Porter, Chantelle Barry and Nicola Posener. A trailer was released at New York Comic Con along with the announcement of the remaining cast. On April 18, 2018, it was announced that the series would premiere on the website ComicBook.com on April 21, 2018, with the remaining five episodes premiering daily.

References

External links

English-language television shows
Television shows based on comics
2018 American television series debuts
Superhero television shows
Valiant Comics adaptations